Sylvia Owori (born 1976) is a Ugandan fashion designer, businesswoman political lobbyist and entrepreneur. She is the Chairperson and Chief Executive Officer of Zipa Modeling Agency, a company that she founded and owns. She is reported to be one of the wealthiest individuals in Uganda, the third-largest economy in the East African Community.

Background and education
Owori was born in Uganda , one of seven siblings. She attended Nsambya Senior Secondary School, in Kampala, the capital of Uganda and the largest city in that country. She studied at Newham College in London, beginning at the age of 19, graduating with Bachelor of Arts degree in fashion design.

Career
Following her studies in the United Kingdom, Owori returned to her native Uganda and opened a boutique that initially sold imported clothes. That enterprise, Sylvie's Boutique, maintains its headquarters at Garden City Mall in Kampala's central business district, with another branch at Mabirizi Complex, also in Kampala, and a third store in Kilimani, a section of Nairobi, the Kenyan capital. It employed 80 people in both countries, as of December 2009.

Owori also began designing and manufacturing clothes for herself and her friends. In 2000, Sylvia Owori was selected to design the clothes worn by the contestants at the MNet Face of Africa, in Dar es Salaam and Cape Town. The following year, in 2001, she was selected to design the clothes worn by the Ugandan finalist at the Nokia Face of Africa competition. From 2001 until 2004, Sylvia Owori took charge of organizing the "Miss Uganda Beauty Pageant", thereby expanding her visibility. In 2004, she launched her own clothes line, under the Sylvia Owori label. In 2005, she launched Africa Woman Magazine, a glossy monthly publication with circulation in Uganda, Kenya, Rwanda, South Sudan and Tanzania. Owori designed and manufactured the costumes for the lead actors, actresses and part of the cast of the film The Last King of Scotland, released in 2006. She is also the founder and owner of Zipa Modeling Agency, a leading fashion talent house in the African Great Lakes area.

Owori is also the Executive Assistant to Chief Coordinator (Gen. Salim Saleh) of Operation Wealth Creation on Public Private Community Partnerships.

Personal life 
Owori is the mother to two sons. One of the children, born in 2008, was fathered by Al Hajji Nasser Sebaggala, the former mayor of Kampala, in office from 2006 to 2011.

See also
 List of wealthiest people in Uganda

References

External links
 Official Business Website of Sylvia Owori 
 Partial List of Ugandan Fashion Designers
  Photograph of Sylvia Owori In 2011

1976 births
Living people
Ugandan businesspeople
People from Eastern Region, Uganda
People from Tororo District
Ugandan fashion designers
Ugandan women fashion designers